= Arthur Ogden =

English footballer

Personal information
- Full name: Arthur Ogden
- Place of birth: Burnley, England
- Position: Inside forward

Senior career*
| Years | Team | Apps | (Gls) |
| 1906–1910 | Burnley | 45 | (12) |
- * Club domestic league appearances and goals

Arthur Ogden was an English professional footballer who played as an inside forward.
